Ivor Barnard (13 June 1887 – 30 June 1953) was an English stage, radio and film actor. He was an original member of the Birmingham Repertory Theatre, where he was a notable Shylock and Caliban. He was the original Water Rat in the first London production of A. A. Milne's "Toad of Toad Hall". In 1929 he appeared on stage as Blanquet, in "Bird in Hand" at the Morosco Theatre in New York, after a successful run in London's West End (Laurence Olivier was the juvenile). The part had been specially written for him by John Drinkwater.

He appeared in more than 80 films between 1921 and 1953. He appeared in the Alfred Hitchcock film The 39 Steps in 1935. In 1943, he played the stationmaster in the Ealing war film Undercover. He also appeared as Wemmick in David Lean's Great Expectations (1946), and as the Chairman of the Workhouse, in Lean's film Oliver Twist (1948). One of his last film appearances was as the murderer Major Jack Ross in John Huston's Beat the Devil (1953) with Humphrey Bogart and Peter Lorre.

Partial filmography

 The Skin Game (1921) as Dawker
 The Skin Game (1931) as Man at Auction (uncredited)
 Sally in Our Alley (1931) as Tod Small
 Illegal (1932) as Albert
 Blind Spot (1932) as Mull
 The Good Companions (1933) as Eric Tipstead
 The Crime at Blossoms (1933) as A late visitor
 Waltz Time (1933) as Falke, the Bat
 Sleeping Car (1933) as Durande
 The Wandering Jew (1933) as Castro
 The Roof (1933) as Arthur Stannard
 Love, Life and Laughter (1934) as Troubetski
 Princess Charming (1934) as Ivanoff
 Brides to Be (1934) as John Boyle
 Death at Broadcasting House (1934) as Joseph Higgins (uncredited)
 The Price of Wisdom (1935) as Mr. Pollit
 The Village Squire (1935) as Mr. Worsford
 The 39 Steps (1935) as Political Meeting Chairman (uncredited)
 The Guv'nor (1935) as Vagrant (uncredited)
 Someday (1935) as Hope
 Foreign Affaires (1935) as Count
 The Man Behind the Mask (1936) as Hewitt
 Dreams Come True (1936) (uncredited)
 The House of the Spaniard (1936) as Mott
 The Mill on the Floss (1937) as Mr. Moss
 Secret Lives (1937) as Baldhead
 Farewell to Cinderella (1937) as Mr. Temperley
 Storm in a Teacup (1937) as Watkins
 Double Exposures (1937) as Mather
 Victoria the Great (1937) as Assassin
 Pygmalion (1938) as Sarcastic Bystander
 What a Man! (1938) as Mayor
 Everything Happens to Me (1938) as Martin
 Cheer Boys Cheer (1939) as Naseby
 The Stars Look Down (1940) as Wept
 The House of the Arrow (1940) as Jean Cladel
 Quiet Wedding (1941) as Bass (uncredited)
 The Saint's Vacation (1941) as Emil
 The Silver Fleet (1943) as Admiral
 Undercover (1943) as Station Master
 Escape to Danger (1943) as Henry Waud
 Up with the Lark (1943)
 Hotel Reserve (1944) as P. Molon, chemist [druggist]
 English Without Tears (1944) as Mr. Quiel
 Don't Take It to Heart (1944) as Bus-Driver
 Great Day (1945) as Bailiff
 Perfect Strangers (1945) as Chemist
 Murder in Reverse? (1945) as Woody
 The Wicked Lady (1945) as Clergyman
 Caesar and Cleopatra (1945) as 2nd. Nobleman
 What Do We Do Now? (1945) as Ted Goof
 Appointment with Crime (1946) as Jonah Crackle
 Great Expectations (1946) as Mr. Wemmick
 The Grand Escapade (1947) as Fisherman
 So Well Remembered (1947) as Spivey
 Mrs. Fitzherbert (1947) as Rev. Burt
 So Evil My Love (1948) as Mr. Watson
 Oliver Twist (1948) as Chairman of the Board
 London Belongs to Me (1948) as Mr. Justice Plymme
 Esther Waters (1948) as Randal
 The Queen of Spades (1949) as Bookseller
 Paper Orchid (1949) as Eustace Crabb
 Madeleine (1950) as Mr. Murdoch
 Hell Is Sold Out (1951) as Taxi Driver (uncredited)
 The Importance of Being Earnest (1952) as Guard on train (uncredited)
 Time Gentlemen, Please! (1952) as Timothy Crouch
 Hot Ice (1952) as Edwin Carson
 Sea Devils (1953) as Benson
 Malta Story (1953) as Old Man (uncredited)
 Beat the Devil (1953) as Major Jack Ross

Radio 

 The Dark Tower (1946)

References

External links

1887 births
1953 deaths
20th-century English male actors
English male film actors
English male radio actors
English male stage actors
Male actors from London